The B77 was a nuclear bomb designed in 1974 to match the delivery capabilities of the B-1A bomber. Meant to replace the Mk 28 and Mk 43 in the strategic role, the program was cancelled in December 1977 due to rising costs and the cancellation of the bomber it had been designed to serve. Many components of the B77 including its already tested physics package (the actual bomb core) were incorporated in the B83 which was developed in its place.

The specifications for the B77 required Full Fuzing Option (FUFO) and the ability for a low altitude, transonic laydown delivery, as well as a free fall from supersonic speeds and altitudes of  delivery. To achieve the low-level delivery capability, the B77 employed a gas generator for roll control and a lifting parachute as the initial part of a two-stage parachute system. The roll control/parachute system was tested at Mach 2.2. Actual detonation time could be varied after the laydown had occurred.

See also
 List of nuclear weapons

References
Hansen, Chuck. U.S. Nuclear Weapons. Arlington, Texas, Areofax, Inc., 1988. .
* Hansen, Chuck, "Swords of Armageddon: U.S. Nuclear Weapons Development since 1945" (CD-ROM & download available). PDF-2.67 Mb. 2,600 pages, Sunnyvale, California, Chucklea Publications, 1995, 2007.  (2nd Ed.)

Cold War aerial bombs of the United States
Nuclear bombs of the United States